Rose Clouds Of Holocaust is a 1995 album by the English neofolk project Death In June, released through New European Recordings.

Track listing

Personnel
 Douglas P. – all instrumentation, vocals, lyrics, engineering, production
 Ken Thomas – engineering, production
 Dave Lokan – engineering 
 Simon Norris – vibraphone, melodica , backing vocals 
 Max Wearing – vocals , backing vocals 
 Rose McDowall – backing vocals 
 David Tibet – vocals 
 Campbell Finley – trumpet

References

1995 albums
Death in June albums